Julia Margaret Cameron (née Pattle; 11 June 1815 – 26 January 1879) was a British photographer who is considered one of the most important portraitists of the 19th century. She is known for her soft-focus close-ups of famous Victorian men and women, for illustrative images depicting characters from mythology, Christianity, and literature, and for sensitive portraits of men, women and children.

After establishing herself first among Calcutta's Anglo-Indian upper-class and then among London's cultural elite, Cameron formed her own salon frequented by distinguished Victorians at the seaside village of Freshwater, Isle of Wight.

After showing a keen interest in photography for many years, Cameron took up the practice at the relatively late age of 48, after her daughter gave her a camera as a present. She quickly produced a large body of work capturing the genius, beauty, and innocence of the men, women, and children who visited her studio at Freshwater, and created unique allegorical images inspired by tableaux vivants, theatre, 15th-century Italian painters, and the work of her creative contemporaries. Her photography career was short but productive; she made around 900 photographs over a 12-year period.

Cameron's work was contentious in her own time. Critics derided her softly focused and unrefined images, and considered her illustrative photographs amateurish and hammy. However, her portraits of respected men (such as Henry Taylor, Charles Darwin, and Sir John Herschel) have been consistently praised, both in her own life and in reviews of her work since. Her images have been described as "extraordinarily powerful" and "wholly original", and she has been credited with producing the first close-ups in the history of the medium.

Biography

Early life and education 
Julia Margaret Cameron was born Julia Margaret Pattle on 11 June 1815, at Garden Reach, Calcutta, India, to Adeline Marie and James Peter Pattle.

James Pattle was a successful official from England who worked in India for the East India Company. His family had been involved with the East India Company for many years, though he traced his line to a 17th-century ancestor living in Chancery Lane, London. Her mother was a French aristocrat and the daughter of Chevalier Ambrose Pierre Antoine de l'Etang, who had been a page to Marie Antoinette and an officer in the Garde du Corps of King Louis XVI. When he died he was shipped back to London in a barrel of rum for burial in Camberwell.

Julia was the fourth of her parents' children. Three of her parents' children died in infancy. Julia and six of her sisters survived into adulthood, inheriting some Bengali blood through their maternal grandmother, Thérèse Josephe Blin de Grincourt. The seven sisters were known for their "charm, wit and beauty" and for being close, outspoken, and unconventional in behaviour and dress. They favoured Indian silks and shawls rather than the demure Victorian attire of other colonial woman.

All of the sisters were sent to France as children to be educated, Julia living there with her maternal grandmother in Versaille from 1818 to 1834, after which she returned to India.

Julia's sisters all made advantageous matches, Adeline marrying a military man who became a General, Sophia marrying a baronet, Louisa, a High Court Judge while Maria married the distinguished Dr John Jackson, with among their descendants being Vanessa Bell and Virginia Woolf. Sara married Henry Prinsep an administrator with the East India Company, and made their home at Little Holland House in Kensington, England an important intellectual centre.  Among their children was Julia's godchild Julia Stephen. Virginia Pattle married Lord Charles Eastnor, later the third Earl Somers. Their eldest daughter was Lady Isabella Caroline Somers-Cocks, the temperance leader, while the younger, Lady Adeline Marie became the Duchess of Bedford.

Marriage and social life

South Africa and Calcutta 
In 1835, after suffering several illnesses, Julia visited the Cape of Good Hope in South Africa with her parents to recover. It was common for Europeans living in India to visit South Africa to convalesce after an illness.

While there, she met the British astronomer and photochemist Sir John Herschel, who was observing the southern celestial hemisphere. She also met Charles Hay Cameron, twenty years her senior and a reformer of Indian law and education who later invested in coffee plantations in what is now Sri Lanka. Charles Hay was also there to convalesce, likely from a virulent malarial fever which often spread during the Indian monsoon season. The illness he suffered caused recurring kidney trouble and diarrhœa for the rest of his life.

They were married in Calcutta on 1 February 1838, two years after meeting. In December of that same year, Julia gave birth to their first child; Sir John Herschel was the godfather. Between 1839 and 1852, they had six children, one of whom was adopted. In all, the Camerons raised 11 children, five of her own, five orphaned children of relatives, and an Irish girl named Mary Ryan whom they found begging on Putney Heath and whom Cameron used as a model in her photographs. Their son, Henry Herschel Hay Cameron, would also become a photographer.

Through the early 1840s—as the organiser of social engagements for the Governor-General, Lord Hardinge—Cameron became a prominent hostess in Anglo-Indian society. During this time she also corresponded with Herschel about the latest developments in photographic technology. In 1839, Herschel informed Cameron about the invention of photography. In 1842, he sent her two dozen calotypes and daguerreotypes, the first photographs she ever saw.

England 
Perhaps to be closer to their two children, the Camerons retired to England in 1845, where they took part in London's artistic and cultural scene. Julia often visited Little Holland House in Kensington, London, where her sister, Sara Prinsep, oversaw a literary and artistic salon "of Pre-Raphaelite painters, poets, and aristocrats with artistic pretensions". Here, she met many of the well-known subjects of her later portraits, including Henry Taylor and Alfred Tennyson.

Daphne du Maurier describes the scene:The nobilitee, the gentree, the litherathure, polithics and art of the counthree, by jasus! It's a nest of proraphaelites, where Hunt, Millais, Rossetti, Watts, Leighton etc, Tennyson, the Brownings and Thackeray etc and tutti quanti receive dinners and incense, and cups of tea handed to them by these women almost kneeling.Benjamin Jowett echoed this when describing Cameron's reverence to these creative personalities after a later visit to the same salon-like atmosphere at Freshwater, "She is a sort of hero-worshipper, and the hero is not Mr Tennyson – he only occupies second place – but Henry Taylor."

In 1847, she was writing poetry, had started a novel, and published a translation of Gottfried August Bürger's Leonora.

In 1848, Charles Cameron retired fully and invested in coffee and rubber plantations in Ceylon, becoming one of the island's largest landowners. The Camerons settled down in England, first in Tunbridge Wells in Kent, where they were neighbours of Taylor, then to East Sheen in 1850. During this time, Cameron became a member of a society for art education and appreciation and George Frederic Watts started working on a painting of Cameron (which is now in the National Portrait Gallery).
In 1860, after an extended visit to Alfred Tennyson at the seaside village of Freshwater, on the Isle of Wight, Cameron hastily purchased a property next door to Tennyson. The family moved there, naming the property "Dimbola" after one of the coffee plantations in Ceylon. A private gate connected the residences and the two families soon started entertaining well-known personalities with music, poetry readings, and amateur plays, creating an artistic scene much as what was previously found at Little Holland House. She lived there until 1875.

Photography career

Early career 
Cameron showed an interest in photography in the late 1850s and there are indications that she experimented with making photographs in the early 1860s. Around 1863, her daughter and her son-in-law gave her her first camera (a sliding-box camera) as a Christmas present. The gift was meant to provide a diversion while her husband was in Ceylon tending to his coffee plantations. Of the gift, her daughter stated "It may amuse you, Mother, to try to photograph during your solitude at Freshwater."

After receiving the camera, she cleared out a chicken coop and converted it into studio space. Later, in an unfinished autobiographical manuscript titled Annals of my Glasshouse, Cameron wrote:I turned my coal-house into my dark room, and a glazed fowl house I had given my children became my glass house. The hens were liberated, I hope and believe not eaten. The profit of my boys upon new laid eggs was stopped, and all hands and hearts sympathised in my new labour, since the society of hens and chickens was soon changed for that of poets, prophets, painters and lovely maidens, who all in turn have immortalized the humble little farm erection. [...] I began with no knowledge of the art... I did not know where to place my dark box, how to focus my sitter, and my first picture I effaced to my consternation by rubbing my hand over the filmy side of the glass.On 29 January 1864 she photographed nine‐year‐old Annie Philpot, an image she described as her "first success". She sent the photograph to the subject's father with the note:My first perfect success in the complete Photograph owing greatly to the docility & sweetness of my best & fairest sitter. This Photograph was taken by me at 1 p.m. Friday Jan. 29th. Printed—Toned—fixed and framed all by me & given as it is now by 8 p.m. this same day.That same year, she compiled albums of her images for Watts and Herschel, registered her work and prepared it for exhibition and sale, and was elected to the Photographic Society of London, of which she remained a member until her death and where she displayed work at yearly exhibitions.

Though Cameron took up photography as an amateur and considered herself an artist, and despite never making commissioned portraits nor establishing a commercial studio, she thought of her photographic activity as a professional endeavour, actively copyrighting, publishing, and marketing her work. Her family did not see substantial profits from their coffee plantations in Ceylon and Cameron may have been looking to bring in some money with her photography. The portraits of celebrities and the high volume of her photographic output also suggest commercial aspirations.

Mid-career 
In 1865, she became a member of the Photographic Society of Scotland and arranged to have her prints sold through the London dealers P. & D. Colnaghi. She presented a series of photographs, The Fruits of the Spirit, to the British Museum, and held her first solo exhibition in November 1865. Her prints generated robust demand and she showed her work throughout Europe, securing awards in Berlin in 1865 and 1866, and an honourable mention in Dublin.

Her photographic activity was supported by her husband. Cameron wrote: "My husband from first to last has watched every picture with delight, and it is my daily habit to run to him with every glass upon which a fresh glory is newly stamped, and to listen to his enthusiastic applause."

In August 1865, the South Kensington Museum, now the Victoria and Albert Museum, purchased 80 of her photographs. Three years later, the museum offered her two rooms to use as a portrait studio, essentially making her the museum's first artist-in-residence.

She produced images of Thomas Carlyle and John Herschel in 1867. By 1868, she was generating sales through P. & D. Colnaghi and a second London agent, William Spooner. In 1869, she created The Kiss of Peace, which she considered her finest work.In the early 1870s, Cameron's work matured. Her elaborate illustrative tableauxs involving religious, literary, and classical figures peaked in a series of images for Tennyson's Idylls of the King, published in 1874 and 1875, evidently at her expense. During this time, she also wrote Annals of my Glass House, an unfinished memoir recounting her photographic career.

Later life 
In October 1873, her daughter died in childbirth. Two years later, because of her husband's ill health, because of the lower cost of living, and to be nearer to their sons who were managing the family coffee plantations (which had been badly harmed by a fungus), Cameron and her husband left Freshwater for Ceylon with "a cow, Cameron's photographic equipment, and two coffins, in case such items should not be available in the East".

Henry Taylor recounts the departure:Mr. and Mrs. Cameron have taken their departure for Ceylon, there to live and die. He had bought an estate there some thirty years ago when he was serving the Crown there and elsewhere in the East, and he had a passionate love for the island, to which he had rendered an important service in providing it with a code of procedure . . . he never ceased to yearn after the island as his place of abode, and thither in his eighty-first year he has betaken himself, with a strange joy. The design was kept secret, – I believe even from their dearest relatives.V.C. Scott O'Connor later wrote about the absence at their vacated home in Freshwater:The house is silent now and tenantless. All its old feverish life and bustle are stilled as is the heart which beat here in true sympathy with every living creature that came within its reach needing such succor. Her pretty maids, her scholars, her poets, her philosophers, astronomers, and divines, all those men of genius who came and sat willingly to her while in a fever of artistic emotion she plied the instruments of her art, – they have all gone, and silence is the only tenant left at Dimbola.The move effectively marked the end of Cameron's photography career; she took few photographs afterwards, mostly of Tamil servants and workers. Fewer than 30 images survive from this period. Cameron's output may have dropped in part because of the difficulty working with collodion in the insect-friendly heat where fresh water was less available for washing prints. The botanical painter and biologist Marianne North recounted her time visiting Cameron in Ceylon:The walls of the room were covered with magnificent photographs; others were tumbling about the tables, chairs, and floors with quantities of damp books, all untidy and picturesque; the lady herself with a lace veil on her head and flowing draperies. Her oddities were most refreshing . . . She also made some studies of natives while I was there, and took such a fancy to the back of one of them (which she said was absolutely superb) that she insisted on her son retaining him as her gardener, though she had no garden and he did not know even the meaning of the word. In February 1876, Macmillan's Magazine published her poem, On a Portrait. The following year, her image The Parting of Sir Lancelot and Queen Guinevere appeared on the cover Harper's Weekly as a wood engraving.

After a short visit to England six months earlier, Cameron fell ill with a dangerous chill and died on 26 January 1879 at the Glencairn estate in Ceylon. It is often reported that her last word was "Beauty" or "Beautiful".

In her 12-year career, Cameron produced around 900 photographs.

Photographic work

Influences 

Cameron was an educated and cultured woman; she was a Christian thinker familiar with medieval art, the Renaissance, and the Pre-Raphaelites. She may also have been influenced by the contemporary interest in phrenology, the study of the human physiognomy as a sign of a person's character. The Old Masters also informed her work. Her compositions and use of light have been connected to Raphael, Rembrandt, and Titian.

John Herschel, who relayed to Cameron the news of the inventions of photography by Talbot and Daguerre, was an important influence on technique and the practicalities of the medium, as indicated in a letter Cameron wrote to the astronomer, "You were my first teacher and to you I owe all the first experience and insights."

It is likely that Cameron saw Reginald Southey photographing on the Isle of Wight during a holiday in 1857 when he visited the Camerons and photographed their children and the children of her neighbour, Alfred Tennyson, before Cameron took up the medium in earnest.

Perhaps the most important photographer to influence Cameron's work was David Wilkie Wynfield. Cameron's style of close-up portraits resembling Titian may well have been learned from Wynfield, since she took a lesson from him and later wrote "I consult him in correspondence whenever I am in difficulty". Much like Cameron, Wynfield published an album of soft-focus portraits of friends dressed up as characters from history or literature. The press compared their photographic work and noted the similarities in style and their consideration of the medium as fine art. She later wrote that "to my feeling about his beautiful photography I owed all my attempts and indeed consequently all my success".

Concept of genius and beauty 
Cameron's portraits are partly the product of her intimacy and regard for the subject, but also intend to capture "particular qualities or essences—typically, genius in men and beauty in women". Mike Weaver, a scholar who wrote about Cameron's photography in work published in 1984, framed her idea of genius and beauty "within a specifically Christian framework, as indicative of the sublime and the sacred". Weaver supposes that Cameron's myriad influences informed her concept of beauty: "the Bible, classical mythology, Shakespeare's plays, and Tennyson's poems were fused into a single vision of ideal beauty."

Cameron herself indicated her desire to capture beauty. She wrote, "I longed to arrest all the beauty that came before me and at length the longing has been satisfied" and "My aspirations are to ennoble Photography and to secure for it the character and uses of High Art by combining the real & Ideal & sacrificing nothing of Truth by all possible devotion to poetry and beauty."

Her female subjects were typically chosen for their beauty, particularly the "long-necked, long-haired, immature beauty familiar in Pre-Raphaelite paintings". In Virginia Woolf's farcical play Freshwater, which described the cultural scene at Freshwater, Cameron's character comically expresses her commitment to beauty:I have sought the beautiful in the most unlikely places. I have searched the police force at Freshwater, and not a man have I found with calves worthy of Sir Galahad. But, as I said to the Chief Constable, "Without beauty, constable, what is order? Without life, what is law?" Why should I continue to have my silver protected by a race of men whose legs are aesthetically abhorrent to me? If a burgler came and he were beautiful, I should say to him: Take my fish knives! Take my cruets, my bread baskets and my soup tureens. What you take is nothing to what you give, your calves, your beautiful calves.

Portraits 
Cameron's photographs are generally placed into three categories: distinguished portraits of men, delicate portraits of women, and illustrative allegories based on religious and literary works.

Men 
Cameron's portraits of men were a kind of hero-worship. To Thomas Carlyle, Cameron wrote "When I have had such men before my camera my whole soul has endeavoured to do its duty towards them in recording faithfully the greatness of the inner as well as the features of the outer man. The photograph thus taken has been almost the embodiment of a prayer."

Most of these men are well-known scientists, writers, or clergymen of the Victorian era. Cameron turned to Old Master paintings and the contemporary idea – based in phrenology – of the ideal "type" to capture the greatness that she perceived in these eminent Victorian individuals. Her aspiration to record this greatness resulted in powerful images displaying a masterly command of chiaroscuro that resulted in "the finest and most revealing gallery of eminent Victorians in existence".

Janet Malcom notes the attention Cameron paid to hair as an expressive element in her portraits, writing that "Her closeups of Tennyson, Carlyle, Darwin, Longfellow, Taylor, Watts, and Charles Cameron are as much celebrations of beards as of Victorian eminence."

Women 
Her images of women are decidedly softer than those of men. With less dramatic lighting and a more typical distance between the sitter and the camera, these images are less dynamic and more conventional than her images of men.

Cameron almost exclusively photographed younger women, never making a portrait even of her neighbour and good friend Emily Tennyson. According to a biographer of Charles Darwin, Cameron refused to take a picture of Darwin's wife, saying that "no woman must be photographed between the ages of eighteen and seventy."

Her mature photographs of women are noted for their subtle but suggestive representation of the obscurity and malleability of female identity. Many of her images of young women obscure their individuality and represent their identity as multifaceted and changeable by showing them "in pairs, or reflected in a mirror... frequently expressive of a deep ambiguity and anxiety."

Janet Malcolm again notes Cameron's attention to the hair of her subjects, writing that "Like the little girls whose hair was mussed to rid it of its prim nursery look, the bigger girls were made to undo their buns and chignons so that their hair would poetically stream or flow or twist around their faces".

Children 
Children – her own children, those of relatives, and young locals – were often models for Cameron. Children were popular subjects in the Victorian era and Cameron kept with the prevailing notion of them as innocent, kind, and noble. She regularly depicted them as angels or as children from Bible stories.

The children in her images were not always cooperative, and her attempts to cast them as allegorical figures were often frustrated by the children's boredom, indignation, or distraction – moods which are often evidenced in her images.

Allegories and illustrations 
Cameron may have found these illustrative group portraits more challenging than her other images. With more people in the image, the chances were greater that someone would move during the long exposures, so more light was needed to shorten the exposure time and arrest the motion. More sitters also meant a greater depth of field was necessary to put everyone in focus, further complicating the compositions.

Cameron's narrative portraits of women were influenced by tableaux vivants and amateur theatre. The women in her images are typically depicted in the idealised Victorian roles of mother and wife.

Religion 

Cameron made over 50 images representing the Madonna, often played by her household servant Mary Hillier. These images present "an ideal of femininity that combines wholesomeness with qualities of sensuality and vulnerability". She represented the Virgin Mary in various scenes from the Bible, such as the Annunciation and the Salutation, but also created a number of images illustrating more obscure religious figures.

Literature 

Cameron took literature as inspiration for her illustrative photographs, representing characters from Shakespeare, Elizabethan poems, novels, plays, and the work of her contemporaries: Alfred Tennyson, Henry Taylor, Christina Rossetti, Robert Browning, and George Eliot.

Idylls of the King

In 1874, Alfred Tennyson asked Cameron to create illustrations for a new edition of his Idylls of the King, a popular series of poems about Arthurian legends. Cameron worked on this commission for three months, capturing several images in her notable soft focus style. She was unhappy with the final publication, and complained that the small size of her images depleted their significance. This prompted Cameron to issue a deluxe version of the Idylls of the King which featured a series of twelve photographs as full-size prints. This series of images, influenced in part by Watts, was her last large-scale project and is considered the peak of her illustrative work.

Reception and legacy

Contemporary reception 
In her own time, Cameron's photographs found a contentious audience, with many criticising her use of soft focus and her unretouched prints.

In 1865, The Photographic Journal reviewed her images, commenting:Mrs. Cameron exhibits her series of out-of-focus portraits of celebrities. We must give this lady credit for daring originality, but at the expense of all other photographic qualities. A true artist would employ all the resources at his disposal, in whatever branch of art he might practise. In these pictures, all that is good in photography has been neglected and the shortcomings of the art are prominently exhibited. We are sorry to have to speak thus severely on the works of a lady, but we feel compelled to do so in the interest of the art.The Photographic News echoed this sentiment:What in the name of all the nitrate of silver that ever turned white into black have these pictures in common with good photography? Smudged, torn, dirty, undefined, and in some cases almost unreadable, there is hardly one of them that ought not to have been washed off the plate as soon as it appeared We cannot but think that this lady's highly imaginative and artistic efforts might be supplemented by the judicious employment of a small boy with a wash leather, and a lens screwed a trifle less out of accurate definition.
The Illustrated London News provided an alternative perspective, writing that her images were "the nearest approach to art, or rather the most bold and successful applications of the principles of fine-art to photography".

Early impact 
Cameron's niece Julia Prinsep Stephen (née Jackson; 1846–1895) wrote a biography of Cameron that appeared in the first edition of the Dictionary of National Biography, 1886.

A few years later, George Bernard Shaw reviewed a posthumous exhibition of Cameron's, writing:While the portraits of Herschel, Tennyson and Carlyle beat hollow anything I have ever seen, right on the same wall, and virtually in the same frame, there are photographs of children with no clothes on, or else the underclothes by way of propriety, with palpably paper wings, most inartistically grouped and artlessly labelled as angels, saints or fairies. No-one would imagine that the artist who produced the marvellous Carlyle would have produced such childish trivialities.Virginia Woolf wrote a comic portrayal of the "Freshwater circle" in her only play Freshwater. Later, in collaboration with Roger Fry, Woolf also edited the first major collection of Cameron's photographs, Victorian Photographs of Famous Men and Fair Women, published in 1926. In the introduction to this collection, Fry wrote that Cameron's allegorical photographs "must all be judged as failures from an aesthetic viewpoint". He was more charitable toward her other work, writing that she had "a wonderful perception of character as it is expressed in form" and that her work was superior to the portraits of James Abbott McNeill Whistler and George Frederic Watts.

Despite the publication of this collection, Cameron's work remained obscure until the mid-1940s.

Mid-century rediscovery 
Helmut Gernsheim, after seeing photographs that Cameron had donated to a railway station in Hampshire hanging in the waiting room of the station, published a book on her work that helped establish her reputation. Gernsheim's review of Cameron's work echoed the earlier sentiments of George Bernard Shaw and Roger Fry, criticising her allegorical and illustrative photos while praising her more straightforward portraits:If the majority of Mrs. Cameron's subject pictures seem to us affected, ludicrous and amateurish, and appear in our opinion to be failures, how masterly, on the other hand, are her straightforward, truthful portraits, which are entirely free from false sentiment, and which compensate for the errors of taste in her studies.In 1984, Mike Weaver disputed this analysis in his book Julia Margaret Cameron 1815–1879, where he elevated Cameron's tableauxs as sincere religious interpretations. Weaver also criticised the characterisations of Cameron's personality that focused on her supposed eccentricities.

21st century reception 
Colin Ford, in the Encyclopedia of Nineteenth-Century Photography calls her images "extraordinarily powerful" and "arguably the first 'close-up' photographs in history". He continues:Her visualisations of poetry are different in style and achievement from those of any other photographer of the time. Her contemporaries decorated books of poetry by Burns, Gray, Milton, Scott, Shakespeare and others with picturesque landscapes, occasionally peopling these with attractively disposed figures in the scenery, but rarely illustrating actual characters or incidents from the story.For the Metropolitan Museum of Art's Heilbrunn Timeline of Art History, Malcolm Daniel writes:Her artistic goals for photography, informed by the outward appearance and spiritual content of fifteenth-century Italian painting, were wholly original in her medium. She aimed for neither the finish and formalized poses common in the commercial portrait studios, nor for the elaborate narratives of other Victorian "high art" photographers such as H. P. Robinson and O. G. Rejlander.Janet Malcolm, in "The Genius of the Glass House" writes that "Cameron's compositions have more connection to the family album pictures of recalcitrant relatives who have been herded together for the obligatory group picture than they do to the masterpieces of Western painting" but that "The beauty that Cameron found, and in a surprising number of cases was able to arrest, among the aging and aged men of the Victorian literary and art establishment is a cornerstone of her achievement".

In 2003, the J. Paul Getty Museum published a complete catalogue of Cameron's known surviving photographs. One caption of a portrait of Alice Liddell (whom Cameron photographed as Alethea, Pomona, Ceres, and St. Agnes in 1872) claims that "Cameron's photographic portraits are considered among the finest in the early history of photography".In 2018, The Norman Album was deemed by the Reviewing Committee on the Export of Works of Art to be of "outstanding aesthetic importance and significance to the study of the history of photography and, in particular, the work of Julia Margaret Cameron—one of the most significant photographers of the 19th century."

In 2019 Cameron was inducted into the International Photography Hall of Fame and Museum.

Retrospectives 
In 2013, the Metropolitan Museum of Art curated an exhibition of Cameron's work, which garnered significant reviews.

In 2015 the Victoria and Albert Museum in London drew on their extensive collection of her work for a 200th anniversary retrospective of Cameron's career that also travelled to Sydney, Australia.

An exhibition at the National Portrait Gallery in London in March 2018 placed her work in relationship to the work of her Victorian contemporaries, Lady Clementina Hawarden, Oscar Rejlander, and Lewis Carroll.

The following retrospective exhibitions have focused on Cameron's oeuvre:

Albums

List of selected publications 

 
 Cameron, J. M. P. (1875). Illustrations by Julia Margaret Cameron of Alfred Tennyson's Idylls of the King and other poems
 Cameron, J. M. P. (1889). Unfinished autobiography "Annals of my glass house" by Julia Margaret Cameron, written 1874, first published 1889
 Cameron, J. M. (1975). The Herschel album: an album of photographs. London (2 St Martin's Place, WC2H 0HE): National Portrait Gallery
 Cameron, J. M., & Ford, C. (1975). The Cameron Collection: an album of photographs. Wokingham: Van Nostrand Reinhold for the National Portrait Gallery
 Cameron, J. M. P., & Weaver, M. (1986). Whisper of the muse: the Overstone album & other photographs. Malibu: J. Paul Getty Museum

Footnotes

References

Further reading 

 
 
 
 
 
 Rosen, Jeff (2016). Julia Margaret Cameron's 'Fancy Subjects''' Manchester University Press
  also available through MOMA here''

External links 

Julia Margaret Cameron at The Museum of Modern Art
Julia Margaret Cameron at The J. Paul Getty Museum
Julia Margaret Cameron family papers, circa 1777–1940 at the Getty Research Institute, Los Angeles, Accession No. 850858.
Julia Margaret Cameron at the National Portrait Gallery
Julia Margaret Cameron at the National Gallery of Art
Julia Margaret Cameron at the Art Institute of Chicago
Julia Margaret Cameron at the National Galleries of Scotland
Alfred Tennyson's Idylls of the King, illustrated by Julia Margaret Cameron

Pioneers of photography
1815 births
1879 deaths
English women photographers
British portrait photographers
Artists from Kolkata
English people of French descent
People from Freshwater, Isle of Wight
Women of the Victorian era
19th-century English photographers
19th-century British women artists
19th-century women photographers
People from British Ceylon
British people in colonial India